Clutch Cargo is an American animated television series created by cartoonist Clark Haas and produced by Cambria Productions, and syndicated beginning on March 9, 1959. The series was notable for its limited animation yet imaginative stories, as well as for being the first widely-known use of Syncro-Vox technology.

Plot 
The series' stories centered on adventurer Clutch Cargo, who was sent around the world on dangerous assignments. Accompanying him on the assignments were his young ward Spinner and his pet Dachshund Paddlefoot. Live-action footage  of a 1929 Bellanca C-27 Airbus was used; series creator Clark Haas was previously a jet pilot. Episodes were produced and serialized in five 5-minute chapters each. The first four chapters ended in cliffhangers, with the fifth chapter concluding the adventure. Haas explained that the show was formatted this way so that "the stations can run one a day on weekdays, then recap the whole for a half-hour Saturday show."

Production technique 
The show was the first to use the "Syncro-Vox" optical printing system because of budgetary limitations and the pressure to create animation within a tight time frame. Syncro-Vox was invented by Edwin Gillette, television cameraman and partner in Cambria Studios, as a means of superimposing real human mouths on the faces of animals for the popular "talking animal" commercials of the 1950s. Clutch Cargo employed the Syncro-Vox technique by superimposing live-action human lips over limited-motion animation or even motionless animation cels.

To further cut costs, Gillette and special-effects man Scotty Tomany supplemented Syncro-Vox with other tricks to save time and money. Haas explained, "We are not making animated cartoons. We are photographing 'motorized movement' and—the biggest trick of all—combining it with live action...Footage that Disney does for $250,000 we do for $18,000." Gillette and Tomany simulated action in the real-time movement either with the camera or within the cel itself. Other live-action shots were superimposed as a means of adding a certain degree of realism and to keep production costs down; for example, footage of real smoke was used for explosions. Traditional animation was also employed in the series on occasion.

The musical soundtrack to Clutch Cargo was also limited. Jazz musician Paul Horn provided a score using  bongos, a vibraphone, and a flute.

Episodes 
The series consisted of 52 episodes.

 The Friendly Head Hunters
 The Arctic Bird Giant
 The Desert Queen
 The Pearl Pirates
 The Vanishing Gold
 The Race Car Mystery
 The Rocket Riot
 Mystery in the Northwoods
 Twaddle in Africa
 The Lost Plateau
 The Ghost Ship
 The Rustlers
 The Missing Train
 The Devil Bird
 Pipeline to Danger
 Mister Abominable
 Operation Moon Beam
 Air Race
 The Haunted Castle
 The Elephant-Nappers
 Dragon Fly
 Sky Circus
 The Midget Submarine
 Cliff Dwellers
 Jungle Train
 Space Station
 The Swamp Swindlers
 The Dinky Incas
 Kangaroo Express
 The Shipwreckers
 The Ivory Counterfeiters
 Dynamite Fury
 Alaskan Pilot
 Swiss Mystery
 Pirate Isle
 Crop Dusters
 The Smog Smuggler
 Global Test Flight
 Dead End Gulch
 The Missing Mermaid
 Flying Bus
 Road Race
 Feather Fuddle
 Water Wizards
 The Terrible Tiger
 The Circus
 Bush Pilots
 Cheddar Cheaters
 The Blunderbird
 The Case of Ripcord Van Winkle
 Fortune Cookie Caper
 Big "X"

Home video

In 1996, a live music venue named after the series, Clutch Cargo's, opened in Pontiac, Michigan.

See also 

 List of animated television series

References

Further reading 
 Arceneaux, Noah. “Clutch Cargo, Space Angel, etc.” Outre #5 (1996).
 Collier, Kevin Scott. Clutch Cargo's Adventure Log Book. CreateSpace Independent Publishing Platform, 2019. 
 "Don't believe your eyes! How 'Clutch Cargo' cuts corners as a television comic strip", TV Guide, December 24, 1960, pp. 28–29.
 Erickson, Hal. Syndicated Television; The First Forty Years 1947–1987. p. 119. 
 Haas, Clark."Clutch Cargo" (comic strip).Jack and Jill magazine, Feb. 1961, pp. 56–61. 
 Terrace, Vincent. Encyclopedia of Television Series, Pilots and Specials 1937–1973. New York, New York Zoetrope. 1986. pp. 96–97.

External links 
 
 Clutch Cargo at toonopedia.com

1950s American animated television series
1959 American television series debuts
1960 American television series endings
1960s American animated television series
American children's animated action television series
American children's animated adventure television series
Aviation television series
English-language television shows
First-run syndicated television programs in the United States
American television series with live action and animation
Television series by Cambria Productions